Keith Anderson (10 April 1929 – 2 February 2007) was a British television actor. He often played policemen or officials. Appearances include  The Adventures of Robin Hood (1957-1960), The Avengers (1961), Doctor Who (1964), Crossroads (1964), Gideon's Way (1965), The Man in the Mirror (1966), Z-Cars (1967-1971), Thriller (1975) and Dixon of Dock Green (1975).

Filmography
A Night to Remember (1958) - Assistant Purser (uncredited)
Burke & Hare (1972) - Client in Brothel

References

External links 

English male television actors
1929 births
2007 deaths